I'm a Celebrity...Get Me Out of Here! is a British reality television show in which celebrity contestants live together in extreme conditions for a few weeks, with no luxuries or contact from the outside world. The celebrities have to complete challenges to earn food for camp; else they have to survive off of basic rations.

The first series aired in 2002, and twenty-two complete series have aired on ITV up to the end of the latest series in November 2022. During each series, contestants are progressively eliminated on the basis of public voting, with the eventual winner being crowned as "King or Queen" of the Jungle/Castle.

Series

Contestants
As of series 22, 254 celebrities have competed. Model and TV personality Katie Price is the only celebrity to have competed in two separate series, whilst Sex Pistols manager Malcolm McLaren is the only person to withdraw from the one show before even entering the jungle. In the show's history, eighteen celebrities have withdrawn or walked, before being voted out. In total, there have been twelve Kings and ten Queens of the Jungle/Castle. Spencer Matthews was ejected from the show by ITV due to steroid use, which is illegal in Australia.

International versions

Gallery

References

External links
 
 
 

Contestants

I'm a Celebrity...Get Me Out of Here! contestants
I'm a Celebrity...Get Me Out of Here! (British TV series) contestants